Anna Fehér (24 September 1921 – 30 December 1999) was a Hungarian gymnast who competed in the 1948 Summer Olympics.

References

1921 births
1999 deaths
Hungarian female artistic gymnasts
Olympic gymnasts of Hungary
Gymnasts at the 1948 Summer Olympics
Olympic silver medalists for Hungary
Olympic medalists in gymnastics
Medalists at the 1948 Summer Olympics
20th-century Hungarian women